Major County Courthouse is a historic courthouse in Fairview, Oklahoma. It was built in 1928 and designed by Tonini and Bramblet, who also designed several other courthouses in Oklahoma. The four-story stone building features Tuscan columns and pilasters spanning the second and third floors. The columns are topped by a frieze reading "MAJOR COUNTY COURT HOUSE", and the building is topped by a projecting cornice and a parapet. The building's front entrance is in a Roman arch; the double doors have glass panels and a fanlight.

The courthouse was added to the National Register of Historic Places on August 23, 1984.

References

External links

Courthouses on the National Register of Historic Places in Oklahoma
Government buildings completed in 1928
Buildings and structures in Major County, Oklahoma
County courthouses in Oklahoma
1928 establishments in Oklahoma
National Register of Historic Places in Major County, Oklahoma